The Swiss Film Award (formerly Swiss Film Prize, also called Quartz) is the national film award of Switzerland, first given out in 1998.

History 
Between 1998 to 2008 the Prize was given during the Solothurn Film Festival. From 2009 onwards the festival hosts the Night of Nominations announcement. Since then, every nomination film receives a cash-prize. Also since 2009, the ceremony has been moved to March in a more glamorous atmosphere and with a broadcasting on television. 2009 was the last year where the Jury was composed of people from the Swiss state and the Federal Office of Culture. Until that year, the award was called Viewfinder and changed its appearance every year with different designers being approached to give it a distinctive look. Since 2009 the prize awarded is a Cristal-like statue, designed by Alfredo Häberli, called "The Quartz".
In 2010 the prizes have been awarded for the first time by the Swiss Film Academy. Due to the coronavirus-pandemic the 2020 the ceremony was cancelled as well as the week of the nominees, where all nominated films were supposed to be presented. The winners were announced in a special programme and are supposed to be presented as part of the annual Locarno Film Festival in August.

Categories 
Current awards
 Best Actor
 Best Actress
 Best Animation Film
 Best Documentary Film
 Best Fiction Film
 Best Short Film
 Best Performance in a Supporting Role
 Best Screenplay
 Best Cinematography
 Best Film Editing
 Best Film Score
 Special Jury Prize

Retired awards
 Best Performance in a Leading Role (2004-2007)
 Best Emerging Actor or Actress (2008-2010)

Ceremonies

See also
 Austrian Film Award
 German Film Award

References

External links 
Official site
All-time winners

Swiss film awards